Radosav Spasojević (born 28 February 1992) is a Montenegrin professional basketball player for Krka.

In his career, Spasojević played for Traiskirchen Lions, Oviedo, Sutjeska, Mega Leks and MZT Skopje.

References

External links
 
 
 

1992 births
Living people
ABA League players
KK Mega Basket players
KK MZT Skopje players
KK Sutjeska players
Montenegrin expatriate basketball people in Serbia
Montenegrin expatriate basketball people in Spain
Montenegrin men's basketball players
Oviedo CB players
Power forwards (basketball)
Sportspeople from Nikšić
Traiskirchen Lions players